"Como Vai Você" (English: 'How are you [doing]'; , in Spanish: "Qué será de ti", English: 'What went on with you') is a song made famous by Brazilian singer Roberto Carlos from his album Roberto Carlos (1972).

Melina León version

In 2001, Puerto Rican singer Melina León covered the song on her album Corazón de Mujer. Her version of the song was included on the soundtrack for El Clon.

Charts

Thalía version

In 2009, Mexican singer Thalía covered the song on her live album Primera fila which was released as the second single from the album.

Live performances
Thalía performed the song together with a medley of her  hits ("Entre el mar y una estrella" and "Amor a la Mexicana") at "Premio Lo Nuestro 2010" awards in which she was honored with "Jóvenes con Legado" award (Young Artist Legacy Award ). Thalía took the award from Gloria Estefan's hands making this honor one of the greatest. "Premio Lo Nuestro 2010" awards honored Thalía for her achievements in the music industry through all these years as she managed to establish her name internationally.

Thalía also performed the song together with Equivocada at Mexican shows "Hoy" and "Adela Micha".

Official versions

Qué será de ti (Live Album Version)
Qué será de ti (Banda Version)

Charts
The song was successful as its predecessor Equivocada, reaching the number 2 spot in the Mexican Singles Chart behind Camila's Aléjate de mí.

Certifications and sales

References

1972 songs
2001 singles
2010 singles
Thalía songs
Spanish-language songs
Pop ballads
Roberto Carlos (singer) songs
Portuguese-language songs
Sony Discos singles
Sony Music Latin singles
Song recordings produced by Áureo Baqueiro